Danube (formerly Jebel Ali Industrial) is a rapid transit station on the Branch Line of the Dubai Metro in Dubai, UAE, serving Jebel Ali and surrounding areas.

The station opened as part of the Red Line on 12 December 2012.

Danube station is located on the Sheikh Zayed Road between the junctions with the D57 and E77 roads. To the east is the Jebel Ali Industrial Area. To the west is the Jebel Ali Container Terminal. The station is close to a number of bus routes.

See also
 Danube (Paris Métro)

References

External links
 

Railway stations in the United Arab Emirates opened in 2012
Dubai Metro stations